Žarko Koprivica (born May 8, 1956) is a Serbian basketball executive and former professional player.

Playing career 
Koprivica played for Crvena zvezda of the Yugoslav Federal League. Over 181 games he averaged 14.9 points per game. He won one Yugoslav Cup in his first senior season. In the 1978–79 season, he averaged 29.3 points per game.

National team career 
Koprivica was a member of the Yugoslav national U16 team that won the bronze medal at the 1975 European Championship for Cadets.

Post-playing career

AS Basket 
Koprivica is a founder and the president of the AS Basket, a basketball club for youth based in Belgrade. The club is founded in 1997. Players who played for the youth team of AS Basket are: Marko Kešelj, Aleksandar Cvetković, Ivan Marinković, Brano Đukanović and many others.

Career achievements 
 Yugoslav Cup winner: 1 (with Crvena zvezda: 1974–75).

Personal life 
Žarko Koprivica is married to Marija (born 1957). They have two sons: Jovan (born 1982) and Nikola (born 1988). Both sons were professional basketball players. Jovan played for Crvena zvezda, Panellinios, Politekhnika-Halychyna, Kryvbas and OKK Beograd. Nikola played college basketball for the Washington State, and for the Superfund and Iraklis.

See also
 List of father-and-son combinations who have played for Crvena zvezda

References

1956 births
Living people
Centers (basketball)
KK Crvena zvezda players
Serbian men's basketball players
People from Prokuplje
Yugoslav men's basketball players